Rupert Neudeck (14 May 1939 – 31 May 2016) was known for his humanitarian work, especially with refugees. He started his career as a noted correspondent for Deutschlandfunk, a German public broadcaster.  Later, he focused on assisting those fleeing conflict.  He was noted for his role in assisting thousands of refugees from Vietnam in the late 1970s.  Neudeck was a winner of numerous awards, including the Theodor Heuss Medal, the Bruno Kreisky Prize for Services to Human Rights, the Erich Kaestner Award and the Walter Dirks Award, and was co-founder of both the Cap Anamur and Green Helmets humanitarian organizations.

Early life and education
Neudeck was born in Danzig, then the Free City of Danzig (now Gdańsk, Poland), and lived in Danzig-Langfuhr (now Wrzeszcz) until 1945. In the final months of World War II, when large numbers of German civilians were being evacuated from eastern Germany, his family had received tickets for the passenger ship MV Wilhelm Gustloff, which left Gdingen (now Gdynia) on 31 January 1945 and was sunk by a Soviet submarine with huge loss of life. The Neudecks missed the sailing, which probably saved their lives.

He studied various subjects in West Germany, including law and Catholic theology.  Neudeck decided to work in journalism, first as a student editor at the University of Münster, then professionally for Catholic radio. In 1977 Neudeck  became a correspondent for Deutschlandfunk.

Humanitarian work
  In 1979, Rupert Neudeck and his wife Christel, along with a group of friends, formed the committee "A ship for Vietnam" and chartered the commercial freighter Cap Anamur for a rescue mission to Southeast Asia. The mission eventually saved more than 10,000 Vietnamese boat people fleeing Vietnam after the war.
 
 
Following the Cap Anamur missions, he continued his humanitarian work on various other projects that aided refugees. The Green Helmets  (Grünhelme) Association, founded in 2003, is dedicated to rebuilding schools, villages, and medical services in various war-torn regions, particularly those in Islamic countries. More recently, he worked to aid Syrian refugees. He was listed on Unsere Besten ("Our Best"), a German poll similar to 100 Greatest Britons.

In 2005, Neudeck was featured in an interview on the Vietnamese entertainment show Paris By Night 77, which commemorated the 30th anniversary of the fall of Saigon and the work of the Cap Anamur Committee. Neudeck's humanitarian efforts continued up to the time of his death.  Most recently he assisted with the emigration of refugees from Syria and Eritrea to Germany.

In 2014 Neudeck received the Dr. Rainer Hildebrandt Human Rights Award endowed by Alexandra Hildebrandt. The award is given annually in recognition of extraordinary, non-violent commitment to human rights.

Death
Neudeck died on 31 May 2016, from complications after heart surgery, aged 77.

References 

1939 births
2016 deaths
German journalists
German male journalists
German humanitarians
People from Gdańsk
Members of the Order of Merit of North Rhine-Westphalia
Naturalized citizens of Germany
People from the Free City of Danzig
German male writers